"50 Years" is a song by Australian Rock-pop group Uncanny X-Men. The song was released in May 1985 as the second single from the band's debut studio album, 'Cos Life Hurts. It peaked at number 4 on the Kent Music Report, becoming the group's first top 5 single.

Track listing 
7" Vinyl (Mushroom – K-9671)
 "50 Years" 
 "Best Looking Guy"

Charts

Weekly charts

Year-end charts

References

1985 singles
Uncanny X-Men (band) songs
Mushroom Records singles